The 56th Dan Kolov & Nikola Petrov Tournament,  was a sport wrestling event held in  Sofia, Bulgaria between 22 and 25 March 2018.

This international tournament includes competition in both men's and women's freestyle wrestling and men's Greco-Roman wrestling. This tournament is held in honor of Dan Kolov who was the first European freestyle wrestling champion from Bulgaria and  European and World Champion Nikola Petroff.

Event videos
The event was air freely on the Bulgarian Wrestling Federation Live YouTube channel.

Medal table

Team ranking

Medal overview

Men's freestyle

Greco-Roman

Women's freestyle

Participating nations

464 competitors from 33 nations participated.
 (6)
 (4)
 (4)
 (66)
 (2)
 (1)
 (15)
 (1)
 (17)
 (24)
 (9)
 (14)
 (7)
 (16)
 (28)
 (8)
 (7)
 (1)
 (6)
 (19)
 (1)
 (5)
 (4)
 (22)
 (18)
 (46)
 (13)
 (1)
 (6)
 (1)
 (57)
 (30)
 (5)

References 

2018 in European sport
2018 in sport wrestling
March 2018 sports events in Europe
2018 in Bulgarian sport